Angiopoietin-1 receptor also known as  CD202B (cluster of differentiation 202B)  is a protein that in humans is encoded by the TEK gene. Also known as TIE2, it is an angiopoietin receptor.

Function 

The TEK receptor tyrosine kinase is expressed almost exclusively in endothelial cells in mice, rats, and humans. (TEK is closely related to the TIE receptor tyrosine kinase.)

This receptor possesses a unique extracellular domain containing 2 immunoglobulin-like loops separated by 3 epidermal growth factor-like repeats that are connected to 3 fibronectin type III-like repeats. The ligand for the receptor is angiopoietin-1. TEK has also been suggested as a marker for nucleus pulposus progenitor cells, from the intervertebral disc, which upon activation by Angiopoietin-1 starts to multiply and differentiate.

Defects in TEK are associated with inherited venous malformations; the TEK signaling pathway appears to be critical for endothelial cell-smooth muscle cell communication in venous morphogenesis.

In cancer patients, TEK (Tie2) is expressed in a subpopulation of monocytes that home in on the tumor and are essential for the formation of new blood vessels there.

Interactions 

TEK tyrosine kinase has been shown to interact with:

 ANGPT2,
 Angiopoietin 1,
 DOK2.

See also 
 Tie-2/Ang-1 signaling

References

Further reading

External links 
 GeneReviews/NCBI/NIH/UW entry on Multiple Cutaneous and Mucosal Venous Malformations
 

Clusters of differentiation
Tyrosine kinase receptors